George Sage may refer to:

George Sage (footballer) (1872–?), English footballer
George Read Sage (1828–1898), United States federal judge

See also
Georges-Louis Le Sage (1724–1803), physicist
Sage (name), disambiguation page